Jeyran-e Olya may refer to:
 Jeyran-e Olya, East Azerbaijan
 Jeyran-e Olya, West Azerbaijan